Wang Xianjun (born 1 June 2000) is a left-footed Chinese footballer currently playing as a centre-back for Dalian Pro.

Club career
Wang Xianjun was promoted to the senior team of Dalian Professional within the 2020 Chinese Super League season and would make his debut in a Chinese FA Cup game on 18 September 2020 against Shandong Luneng Taishan F.C. in a 4-0 defeat. He would go on to make his debut in a league game on 27 September 2020 against Guangzhou Evergrande Taobao, where he came on as a substitute in a match that ended in a 1-0 defeat.

Career statistics

References

External links

2000 births
Living people
Chinese footballers
Association football defenders
Dalian Professional F.C. players